Alexandre Tsutsunava (born  – 25 October 1955) was a Georgian theatre and film director.

His film Christine, based on a story by Egnate Ninoshvili, was the first Georgian feature film.
His other films include Who is the Guilty?.

The Alexandre Tsutsunava Ozurgeti Drama Theatre, inaugurated in 1961 in Georgia, was named after him. In December 2017, the Gosfilmofond of Russia returned the original film Who is the Guilty? to Georgia following a 2014 deal between Russia and Georgia. In 2021, the Georgian National Film Center had fully restored Tsutsunava's film Revolt in Guria (1928).

Filmography
 As director
 Janki guriashi  (1928)
 Khanuma (1926)
 Ori monadire (1927)
 Vin aris damnashave ? (1925)
 Qristine  (1918)
 Berikaoba-Keenoba (1909)
 As writer
 Janki guriashi  (1928)
 Khanuma (1926)
 Ori monadire (1927)
 Vin aris damnashave ? (1925)
 Qristine  (1918)

References

External links
 Alexandre Tsutsunava 

1881 births
1955 deaths
Film directors from Georgia (country)
Soviet film directors
People's Artists of Georgia
Stalin Prize winners